Ephebopus uatuman also known as the Emerald Skeleton Tarantula is a tarantula native to Brazil. It was first described by Lucas, Silva and Bertani in 1992. It is named after the Uatuman River.

Description 
Females of this species live for up to 15 years, while males live 2 to 4 years. They grow to be about 10cm in size, although their namesake emerald color is usually not apparent. As it's usually only seen after molts. The carapace and legs are usually a dark amber color, with the abdomen of the same color, but with long reddish hairs. There is also yellow banding between the femora and patella of all legs.

Identification 
They can be confused with E. cyanognathus, but they can be distinguished, as this species lacks the iconic blue chelicerae of the Blue Fang Tarantula. And they can be distinguished from all other by the coloration in females, and the shape of the genitalia of both sexes.

Distribution 
They are found all throughout the Amazonean Region of Brazil, where it remains quite hot and tropical. Usually maintaining a temperature of 27C, although there is a bit of variance between the months. It also maintains an incredibly high level of humidity, usually maintaining a humidity of over 80%.

Behavior 
They are quite skittish, but surprisingly defensive, receiving a bite from this species is not as rare as with most new world tarantulas. They are a burrowing species, that they will usually stay in. They usually make a burrow in the shape of a tub, which is usually covered in leaf litter. Quite similar to those of the E. cyanognathus. The entrance and the leaves where bound together with leaves, and the burrow ended in a chamber which was about 20-40cm deep.

References 

Theraphosidae
Spiders of Brazil
Spiders described in 1992